Arthur Kittredge "Dick" Watson (April 23, 1919 – July 26, 1974) was an American businessman and diplomat. He served as president of IBM World Trade Corporation and United States Ambassador to France. His father, Thomas J. Watson, was IBM's founder and oversaw that company's growth into an international force from the 1920s to the 1950s. His brother Thomas J. Watson Jr. was the president of IBM from 1952 to 1971 and United States Ambassador to the Soviet Union.

Early life
Arthur K. Watson—known as "Dick" by his friends and colleagues—was born in Summit, New Jersey. He attended The Hotchkiss School and Yale University.

Career
In the late 1940s, Watson assisted his father, IBM's president Thomas J. Watson Sr., in the incorporation and organization of the IBM World Trade Corporation—the subsidiary which handled IBM's business outside the United States. As president and later board chairman of the IBM World Trade Corporation, Dick Watson expanded its operations throughout the world. During his 21 years of leadership, he spent a large part of his time traveling abroad, often accompanied by his family. He established numerous new country operations, selected managers and guided the expansion of the international businesses.

When he began in IBM in February 1947, Dick Watson spoke fluent French. During the next five years of his business career, he spent more than an hour a day to master Spanish and German, and to develop a working knowledge of Portuguese. These linguistic skills were a major asset to Watson throughout his international career.

At the time Watson joined the IBM World Trade Corporation subsidiary upon its formation in 1949, IBM sales outside the United States were less than $50 million. When he resigned in 1970 to become Ambassador to France, IBM World Trade Corporation sales had grown to more than $2.5 billion, and the company had established business operations in 108 countries. By then, net income from World Trade operations equaled those of the U.S. company.

From his first European business trip with his father in 1948, Dick Watson held to a conviction that Western Europe would eventually emerge in the postwar period as a united economic community. He supported the formation of the European Economic Community and made sure that the IBM World Trade Corporation was one of the first U.S.-based companies to build up its manufacturing and development capabilities within the Common Market.

He was also convinced that the U.S. business community should play a larger role in aiding the developing countries of the world. He sought ways to build up local economies in Asia and Latin America. He went on two U.S. government missions to Latin America. In 1964, Watson, with New York Senator Jacob Javits and others, formed ADELA, an investment institution in Lima, Peru. Funded by a worldwide group of banks and corporations, it provided capital for local businesses in Latin America. In Nigeria, he established an IBM educational facility at Ibadan University to provide training in computer skills.

Dick Watson served at the requests of Presidents John F. Kennedy and Lyndon B. Johnson on two panels established to stimulate U.S. trade. The 14-member panel he headed for President Johnson reported a number of findings later adopted by the U.S. Agency for International Development. He was a member of New York Governor Nelson Rockefeller's Commission on Critical Choices for Americans.

As president of the International Chamber of Commerce in 1967 and 1968, Dick Watson became an international advocate for "freer" trade. In 1968 he also founded, with David Rockefeller, the Emergency Committee for American Trade, a trade association that was eventually joined by the heads of 60 of the largest corporations in the United States. Its purpose was to muster support against protectionism in the United States.

In 1970, Watson resigned his positions as a chairman of the board of IBM World Trade, and vice chairman and director of IBM, to become U.S. Ambassador to France. He was also the first official liaison of the United States with the People's Republic of China through its then Ambassador to France, Huang Chen.

Watson was a benefactor of the Metropolitan Museum of Art, serving as a trustee of the Museum and as a member of the Museum's Centennial committee.

Dick Watson's contributions to international relations were recognized with honors from several countries. He received the Vatican's Equestrian Order of St. Sylvester. He had already won the French Legion of Honor prior to his ambassadorship. Before he returned from France, President Georges Pompidou awarded him the rank of Grand Cross of the Republic's Order of Merit, one of France's highest honors.

Upon his return from France in 1972, Watson was reelected to IBM's board of directors and its executive committee. He also founded partnership Dankist, a venture capital firm located in Stamford, Conn.

Arthur K. Watson died as a result of a fall on July 26, 1974, in New Canaan, Connecticut, at age 55.  Yale University's computer science building is named in his honor.

Sources
http://www-03.ibm.com/ibm/history/exhibits/builders/builders_watson.html

References

1919 births
1974 deaths
20th-century American businesspeople
20th-century American diplomats
Accidental deaths from falls
Accidental deaths in Connecticut
Ambassadors of the United States to France
Hotchkiss School alumni
IBM employees
People from Summit, New Jersey
Yale University alumni